Mount Hope Farm (also known as Gov. William Bradford House) is a historic estate on Metacom Avenue in Bristol, Rhode Island, United States.

Description and history
The farm is located near the Mount Hope Bridge in Bristol, Rhode Island, and the grounds have been farmed since the 1680s.  The present  are a remnant of a much larger property that included Mount Hope, the traditional seat of the Wampanoag people.  The main house on the farm was built in several stages, the earliest portion dating to c. 1745.  Its builder was Isaac Royall Jr., a noted merchant and owner of plantations in the West Indies.  It was purchased in 1783 by William Bradford, who passed the property on to his children. Samuel W. Church purchased it from Bradford's heirs in 1837; he was a wealthy merchant from Taunton, Massachusetts and he made a major addition to the house in 1840.  In 1917, the property was purchased by R. F. Haffenreffer, a wealthy industrialist and collector.

The farm was added to the National Register of Historic Places in 1977.  It is now operated as a bed and breakfast inn and function facility. The farm is locally known for its farmer's market, held every Saturday year-round.

Gallery

References

External links

Mount Hope Farm site
VisitRI info

Landmarks in Rhode Island
Houses completed in 1745
Archaeological sites in Rhode Island
Museums in Bristol County, Rhode Island
Historic house museums in Rhode Island
Buildings and structures in Bristol, Rhode Island
Farms on the National Register of Historic Places in Rhode Island
National Register of Historic Places in Bristol County, Rhode Island
1745 establishments in the Thirteen Colonies